Ascanio Castagna (1567 – 16 December 1627) was a Roman Catholic prelate who served as Bishop of Isola (1622–1627).

Biography
Ascanio Castagna was born in Turin, Italy in 1567.
On 8 August 1622, he was appointed during the papacy of Pope Gregory XV as Bishop of Isola. On 11 September 1622, he was consecrated bishop by Ottavio Bandini, Cardinal-Bishop of Palestrina, with Ulpiano Volpi, Bishop of Novara, and Alessandro Guidiccioni (iuniore), Bishop of Lucca, serving as co-consecrators. He served as Bishop of Isola until his death on 16 December 1627.

References

External links and additional sources
 (for Chronology of Bishops) 
 (for Chronology of Bishops)  

17th-century Italian Roman Catholic bishops
Bishops appointed by Pope Gregory XV
1567 births
1627 deaths